David Horner is the name of:

David Murray Horner (born 1948), Australian military historian and academic.
David Stuart Horner (1900-1983), English crime fiction novelist and the longtime partner of Osbert Sitwell